Carl Pettersson (born 1977) is a Swedish golfer.

Carl Pettersson may also refer to:
 Carl Emil Pettersson (1875–1937), Swedish sailor and inspiration for Ephraim Longstocking
 Carl Axel Pettersson (1874–1962), Swedish curler

See also
Carl Peterson (disambiguation)
Carl Petersen (disambiguation)